Disney Village is a shopping, dining, and entertainment complex in Disneyland Paris, located in the town of Marne-la-Vallée, France. Originally named Festival Disney, it opened on April 12, 1992, covering an area of approximately  inside what was then known as Euro Disney Resort.

Based on Walt Disney World's Disney Village Marketplace (now Disney Springs), Disney Village was designed by architect Frank Gehry with towers of oxidized silver and bronze-colored stainless steel under a canopy of lights. It is adjacent to the two theme parks of Disneyland Paris and the Lake Buena Vista hotel area.

History

Original concept

Disney specified that the primary focus of the new facility should be entertainment. It was envisioned as an attraction inside of the Euro Disney Resort, as well as a free transitional space for visitors of the Euro Disneyland theme park and train passengers from the TGV/RER station traveling to the resort hotels. The space would include numerous shops, bars, concerts, shows, and nightclubs.

The original concept was a large, open space full of life and music. It would be lit from all sides around a central avenue and include a starry sky as its crowning feature. The columns that would support this sky would be the remnants of an old power station, which had been left standing after the site had been converted.

Gehry noted:

Changes and alterations

Although the starry sky was generally well-received, the same could not be said for many other aspects of Festival Disney. From the beginning, guests and cast members alike criticized the project, perceiving it as having a cold, industrial, and soulless atmosphere. As a result, many changes were made to Gehry's original concept. Metal frames that had been placed on many of the pylons were removed and replaced with statues and food counters.

In 1996, just four years after opening, Festival Disney was renamed Disney Village. Popular restaurant chain Planet Hollywood opened in front of the Buffalo Bill's Wild West Show building, and the following year an eight-screen Gaumont multiplex cinema complex opened next door to Planet Hollywood, blocking the Wild West Show's original entrance.

Many changes and adjustments took place in existing buildings over the next 10 years, such as the opening of Café Mickey in 2002 (replacing the Los Angeles Bar & Grill), the opening of King Ludwig's Castle in 2003 (replacing Rock 'n' Roll America), and the opening of the Rainforest Café in 1999 (replacing Key West). On January 25, 1999, a large McDonald's fast food restaurant opened with a theme based on Italy's Commedia dell'arte. Later in 2004, a 570-seat IMAX cinema opened as part of the Gaumont multiplex. Finally, on December 3, 2004, an Art Deco themed multi-story parking structure called VINCI Park (now Indigo) opened.

In 2004, the resort management team began renovations that would take several years to complete. The neon lights, oversized signs, and central stage were all removed from the main area. Colorfully lit balloons were added to the remaining columns for nighttime lighting. PanoraMagique, one of the largest captive balloons in the world, opened in April 2005. It carries up to 30 passengers  into the sky. In 2008, resort management added large planters that contained trees, hedges, and flowers to the main thoroughfare. Terraces were added to restaurants and cafés, and the facades of buildings were updated. In the same year, a new beverage stand/snack bar was added near the entrance to Disney Village, and the tourist kiosk nearby was rebuilt in more of a neo-industrial Parisian style. In 2009, the Buffalo Trading Company closed and the premises are now occupied by a Starbucks coffee house.

As part of a €2 billion expansion of the Disneyland Resort, it has been confirmed that Disney Village will receive an overhaul and potential expansion. Further details have not yet been confirmed.

Current venues

Attractions and entertainment
Disney Stadium Arcade Games
Disney Village Marina
Disney Village Stage
Dôme Disney Village : Conference center for professional event and evenings. It sometimes hosts public events like the 2005 production of Grease, concerts or sports competitions.
Lake Disney Road Train
Gaumont Disney Village : Cinema with IMAX, 4DX and D-Box Technologies
PanoraMagique : Aerophile Observational Balloon

Restaurants and bars
Annette's Diner (table service restaurant)
Ben & Jerry's Kiosque De Glaces (ice cream kiosk)
Billy Bob's Country Western Saloon (table service restaurant & snack bar)
Coca-Cola Cool Stop (refreshment kiosk)
Earl of Sandwich (counter service restaurant)
Five Guys (counter service restaurant)
La Grange (buffeteria)
McDonald's (counter service restaurant)
New York Style Sandwiches (counter service restaurant)
Rainforest Cafe (table service restaurant)
Sports Bar (snack bar)
Starbucks (coffee house)
The Steakhouse (table service restaurant)
Vapiano (counter service restaurant)

Shopping
World of Disney
Disney Store
Disney Fashion
The Disney Gallery
World of Toys 

Lego Store
Planet Hollywood Gifts
Rainforest Cafe Retail Village
Bureau de change

Closed venues
Streets of America - closed in 1993
The Surf Shop - closed 1993
Key West Seafood - closed in 1999
Los Angeles Bar & Grill - closed in 2002
Rock'n'Roll America - closed in 2003
Buffalo Trading Company - closed in 2009
Hurricanes Discotheque - closed on March 1, 2010
Hollywood Pictures - closed in July 2013
NEX Fun Bowling & Games - closed in 2016
Buffalo Bill's Wild West Show with Mickey & Friends: an original show re-enacted twice nightly in a purpose-built arena since 1992. Despite technological production elements, the show retained a high degree of authenticity, including bison, Longhorn cattle, and quarter horses imported from North America. The cast included Native American members, as well as trained rodeo cowboys. Most of the more famous elements of the original show remain, including the Pony Express, Indian Attack, and Stagecoach Robbery. A dinner show entry included a cowboy hat and a themed menu of chili and barbecue ribs. The show was approaching world-record attendance with over 10,000 shows performed in front of 8.5 million guests. Since 2009, the show starred Mickey Mouse and his friends. - closed in 2020
Café Mickey (table service restaurant) - closed in 2020 to be replaced by Rosalie
Planet Hollywood (table service restaurant) - closed in 2023
King Ludwig's Castle (table service restaurant) - closed in 2023 to be replaced by The Royal Pub.

See also
Disney Springs at Walt Disney World Resort
Downtown Disney (California) at Disneyland Resort
Ikspiari at Tokyo Disney Resort

References

External links

 
 Disney Village Food Guide
 Google Maps - Disney Village 
 DLRP Magic - Disney Village Guide
 PanoraMagique Official Site
 VINCI Park Press Release
 EuroSouvenirland - Disney Village's former buildings photos

Disneyland Paris
IMAX venues
1992 establishments in France